The 2005 ESPY Awards (for the Olympic year 2004 and the year 2005) were announced from Kodak Theatre on July 13, 2005 and showed during the telecast on ESPN, July 17, 2005. ESPY Award is short for Excellence in Sports Performance Yearly Award.

The show was hosted by Matthew Perry and had performances from Destiny's Child.

Winners
Best Female Athlete – Annika Sörenstam, golf
Best Male Athlete – Lance Armstrong, cycling
Best Team – Boston Red Sox
Best Coach/Manager – Bill Belichick, New England Patriots
Best Game – ALCS Game 5 (Yankees–Red Sox)
Best Championship Performance – Curt Schilling, Boston Red Sox pitcher
Best Male Olympic Performance – Michael Phelps, swimming
Best Female Olympic Performance – Team USA softball
Best Moment – Reggie Miller's final game
Best Play – Blake Hoffarber's last second 3-pointer from flat on his back
Best Upset – Bucknell beats Kansas in NCAA Tournament
Best Comeback – Mark Fields, Carolina Panthers 
Best Breakthrough – Dwyane Wade, Miami Heat
Best Record-Breaking Performance – Peyton Manning, Indianapolis Colts
Best Sports Movie – Friday Night Lights
Best Male Action Sports Athlete – Dave Mirra, bike stunt
Best Female Action Sports Athlete – Sofia Mulanovich, surfing
Best Male College Athlete – Matt Leinart, USC football
Best Female College Athlete – Cat Osterman, Texas softball
Best Male Athlete with a Disability – Marlon Shirley, track and field
Best Female Athlete with a Disability – Erin Popovich, swimming
Best Outdoor Sports Athlete – J.R. Salzman, lumberjack
Best Driver – Michael Schumacher
Best MLB Player – Albert Pujols, St. Louis Cardinals
Best NBA Player – Steve Nash, Phoenix Suns
Best WNBA Player – Lauren Jackson, Seattle Storm
Best Bowler – Walter Ray Williams
Best Boxer – Bernard Hopkins
Best NFL Player – Peyton Manning, Indianapolis Colts
Best Golfer – Tiger Woods
Best Jockey – Jeremy Rose
Best Soccer Player – Mia Hamm
Best Male Tennis Player – Roger Federer
Best Female Tennis Player – Maria Sharapova

In memoriam
Ken Caminiti
Glenn Davis
Cotton Fitzsimmons
Clarence Gaines
Reggie White

References

2005
2005 sports awards
ESPY
2005 in sports in California